Guido Andreozzi and Jaume Munar were the defending champions but only Andreozzi chose to defend his title, partnering Ariel Behar. Andreozzi lost in the first round to Roberto Maytín and Nathan Pasha.

Mateusz Kowalczyk and Szymon Walków won the title after defeating Attila Balázs and Andrea Vavassori 7–5, 6–7(8–10), [10–8] in the final.

Seeds

Draw

External Links
 Main Draw

Poznań Open - Doubles
2018 Doubles